Maxim Repinetchi is a Moldovan player who currently is playing for FC Olimpia Bălți.

References
http://moldova.sports.md/maxim_repenetchi/stats/

1989 births
Living people
Moldovan footballers
Association football midfielders
CSF Bălți players
FC Costuleni players